Districts of Burgenland

Bezirk Jennersdorf is a district of the state of Burgenland in Austria. The district has a population of 17,158, as of 2022, and an area of 253km. The district is the southernmost in Burgenland. The largest settlement in the district is Jennersdorf, followed by Rudersdorf and Sankt Martin an der Raab. The district contains the lowest percentage of young people in Austria, with 15.5% of the population of the district under 20 years old.

Municipalities